The Ambassador Award is one of the most prestigious Union level awards of the American Geophysical Union (AGU) that recognizes individuals whose excellence and leadership in research, education and innovation have significantly advanced Earth and space science. The Ambassador Award recognizes the value of AGU members’ outstanding contributions that benefit society above and beyond their own research.

The award was established by the AGU in 2013 to recognize the groundbreaking contributions of individuals whose achievements extend beyond the scope of traditional scientific honors. The award is annually given between one to five individuals with notable achievements in societal impact, service to the Earth and space community, scientific leadership, and promotion of talent/career pool.

Ambassador Award is the only Union level award of the AGU whose recipients are automatically made AGU Fellows.

The Ambassador Award was approved by the AGU Board of Directors On 20 September 2013 as a step forward by the AGU in building the community of scientists whose dedication to reaching across boundaries has made science visible and compelling, empowered new voices, and inspired future generations of researchers.

Past recipients 
The following list is based on the information provided by the AGU.

See also 

 American Geophysical Union

References 

American science and technology awards